All I Need is the debut studio album from General Hospital star Jack Wagner. Quincy Jones protégé Glen Ballard (who would go on to write with and produce Wilson Phillips six years later, and have massive success in the 1990s with Alanis Morissette's Jagged Little Pill) and Clif Magness (who also worked in a musical context with Ballard on Wilson Phillips' debut album) oversaw the project, co-writing some of the material as well as playing some instruments. Despite an ability to play guitar, and despite playing in several live shoots for the title track, Wagner himself only sang on the disc.

The album featured a huge hit in the title track, which climbed all the way to number two and stayed there for two weeks; it was also a number one AC hit for two weeks. Rare for the time it was released, "All I Need" was notable in that the song was able to climb the charts while not having the assistance of an accompanying music video. For the album's second single, "Premonition", a music video was made and it debuted on NBC's Friday Night Videos in January, 1985. A third and final single, "Lady of My Heart", was released in the spring of 1985 and reached #76 on the Billboard Hot 100. "Lady of My Heart" is notable for being used on General Hospital as the love theme of Wagner's character Frisco and Felicia (played by Kristina Malandro). Wagner would later marry Malandro and have two children together, Peter and Harrison.

Track listing
"Premonition" (Tom Keane, Clif Magness, Mark Mueller) – 3:15
"What You Don't Know" (Mueller, Mark Bryant) – 3:32
"Whenever Hearts Collide" (Matthew Garey, Ellen Schwartz, Roger Bruno) – 3:39
"Fighting the Nights" (Magness, Glen Ballard) – 3:06
"All I Need" (Magness, Ballard, David Pack) – 3:29
"Make Me Believe It" (Magness, Mueller) – 3:01
"Sneak Attack" (Roy Freeland, Peter Leinheiser, Hummie Mann) – 3:15
"After the Fact" (Jerome Stocco) – 4:05
"Tell Him (That You Won't Go)" (Magness, Schwartz, Bruno) – 2:43
"Lady of My Heart" (Ballard, David Foster, Jay Graydon) – 4:02
Note: The original release of the album was as an EP, containing the tracks "Make Me Believe It", "Premonition", "All I Need", "Tell Him That You Won't Go", and "Sneak Attack." After the EP's initial success, five additional tracks were added and it was released as an LP.

Production 
 Arranged and Produced by Glen Ballard and Clif Magness
 Recording and Mixing – Francis Buckley and Ian Eales
 Assistant Engineer – Ray Blair
 Recorded at Wilder Bros. Studios (Los Angeles, CA) and Weddington Studios (North Hollywood, CA).
 Mixed at Weddington Studios 
 Mastered by Steve Hall at Future Disc (Hollywood, CA).
 Art Direction – Laura LiPuma
 Photography – Penny Wolin

Personnel 
 Jack Wagner – lead vocals
 Tom Keane – synthesizers (1)
 John Van Tongeren – synthesizers (1, 6, 7, 9), keyboards (2, 8)
 Sam Bryant – keyboards (2)
 Mark Vieha – keyboards (4)
 Clif Magness – backing vocals (1, 4–7, 9), guitars (2-9)
 Michael Thompson – lead guitar (2)
 Davey Faragher – bass (2-8, 10)
 Bill Elliott – drums (1, 5, 6, 7, 9), keyboards (3, 10), acoustic piano (5), synthesizers (5)
 Pat Mastelotto – drums (2, 3, 4, 8, 10)
 Jerry Peterson – saxophone solo (10)
 Siedah Garrett – backing vocals (2)
 Edie Lehmann – backing vocals (2, 4)
 Rosemary Butler – backing vocals (5, 6, 7)
 Debbie Pearl – backing vocals (5)

References

External links
YouTube video of "All I Need" performed on Solid Gold

1984 debut albums
Albums produced by Glen Ballard
Qwest Records albums